Alexander Alexandrovich Trushkov (Трушков Александр Александрович; born July 31, 1996) is a Russian ice hockey goaltender. He is currently playing with HC Spartak Moscow of the Kontinental Hockey League (KHL).

Trushkov made his KHL debut playing with Spartak Moscow during the 2013–14 KHL season.

References

External links

1996 births
Living people
Admiral Vladivostok players
HC Spartak Moscow players
Russian ice hockey goaltenders
Ice hockey people from Moscow